Lydia Mato is a Ghanaian sprinter who specializes in the 1000, 3000 and 5000 meters. She holds the national record in the 3000 meters with 9:31.97 minutes after winning the 2015 Nebraska Invitational, in May 2015. She became the first Ghanaian ever to win a US Cross County Championship at any level in US school system, during the US Cross Country Championship in 2014.

Competition Record

References 

Living people
Ghanaian female middle-distance runners
Year of birth missing (living people)